Marcel Brunie (29 June 1894 – 12 April 1977) was a French racing cyclist. He rode in the 1922 Tour de France.

References

1894 births
1977 deaths
French male cyclists
Place of birth missing